The Doon of May is a conifer plantation associated with an Iron Age hill fort in Dumfries and Galloway, south-west Scotland. The plantation was purchased from the Forestry Commission by the Tinne Beag Workers’ Co-operative in 1999 and since then the co-operative has been managing the woodland for sustainable use of both timber and non-timber forest products, while increasing biodiversity and restoring native vegetation types where possible.

Woodland 

The woodland comprises  of sitka spruce plantation with a substantial area of semi-natural deciduous woodland of oak, ash, beech, birch, Scots pine, willow, alder, and sycamore. There is also  of peat bog wetland that was clear-felled around 1998. It is being regenerated with birch, rowan, willow and oak. Within the sitka there are many wetland glades of derelict alder coppice and areas containing a variety of sphagnums.

Hill fort 
The Doon of May plantation takes its name from a vitrified Iron Age hill fort on the south-west of the plantation. The facing stones of the heavily vitrified wall have almost entirely gone. Natural cliffs enhance the defensive nature of the site, and no evidence survives of outer defences. The Doon of May is a scheduled monument.

Boundaries 
The northern boundary of the woodland is formed by the south edge of Mochrum Loch, a Site of Special Scientific Interest, hosting Britain's largest inland nesting colony of cormorants. The woodland is adjacent to part of the Sustrans National Cycle Network.  A Peace Pole has been erected at the eastern side of the public road which passes through the plantation.

References

External links 

Tinne Beag Workers Co-operative Limited
Mochrum Parish

Forests and woodlands of Scotland
Hill forts in Scotland
Archaeological sites in Dumfries and Galloway
Scheduled monuments in Scotland